The Knights of Ak-Sar-Ben Foundation is a 501(c)(3) civic and philanthropic organization in Omaha, Nebraska.

History
The organization was formed in 1895 in an attempt to keep the Nebraska State Fair in Omaha after receiving an ultimatum to provide entertainment "other than saloons, gambling houses and honky tonks." The board's solution was to strike out to secure all the floats used that year in the Mardi Gras parade in New Orleans.  While in New Orleans, they decided to model their organization on the parade's Krewe concept complete with "royalty" and "coronations." According to the organization's web site, Dudley Smith suggested a name for the new organization, and was quoted as saying, "Why not reverse the name of our beloved state, since everything seems to be going backwards these days?"

The name is "Nebraska" spelled in reverse, and with Smith's suggestion, Ak-Sar-Ben was born. While the purpose of the organization was to save the Nebraska State Fair for Omaha, it was eventually moved to Lincoln and subsequently to Grand Island.

Initiatives

Other initiatives the group has pursued include the purchase of the Douglas Street Bridge (the first road bridge across the Missouri River), in hopes of removing its tolls (the bridge was renamed the Ak-Sar-Ben Bridge).  From the 1920s through the 1990s, the Knights built and operated a horse racing track and arena complex, also named Ak-Sar-Ben. In 1992 the Knights donated the horse racing track and arena complex to a new legal entity – the Ak-Sar-Ben Future Trust. This organization is developing the property for multi-purpose under the name Aksarben Village,.

The Knights of AKSARBEN Foundation continues its efforts to serve the 112-year-old mission of "building a more prosperous heartland where communities can flourish and every child can succeed." The organization supports financial need based scholarship programs, administers Nebraska's Pioneer Farm program, Good Neighbor Awards, and Ike Friedman Leadership Awards. It produces the AKSARBEN Stockshow & Rodeo and the Ak-Sar-Ben Coronation Ball.

The AKSARBEN Stockshow & Rodeo, was established in 1927 and has a mission of empowering youth to reach their full potential as productive adults through learning opportunities which develop live skills and character.

AKSARBEN Rodeo is an annual festival of the region's heritage. Its three core events include the Douglas County Fair, The Ak-Sar-Ben 4-H Livestock Exposition, and the Ak-Sar-Ben Rodeo, host of the Wrangler ProRodeo Tour – Omaha Round.

AKSARBEN's Coronation Ball is a celebration of volunteerism and civic pride. It is a fund-raising event that supports need-based scholarship programs and recognizes the volunteer efforts of individuals throughout the region through the honoring of families.

In 2005, the Omaha Ak-Sar-Ben Knights of the American Hockey League were named after the Knights, which had a minority ownership stake in the team, but after two seasons of mediocre attendance the franchise was relocated in 2007 to the Quad Cities; it is currently located in Calgary, Alberta.

See also
 Gambling in Omaha, Nebraska
 History of Omaha
 The Ancient Order of A-kep-ot Ster-boo

References

External links 
 Knights of Ak-Sar-Ben

Agricultural organizations based in the United States
Culture of Omaha, Nebraska
Agricultural shows in the United States
Service organizations based in the United States
Non-profit organizations based in Nebraska
Organizations established in 1895
501(c)(3) organizations
1895 establishments in Nebraska